Zoubeir Baya (or Beya) (born 15 May 1971) is a Tunisian former professional footballer with a distinguished career as one of his country's most accomplished football exports. Baya, an attacking midfielder, displayed considerable skill and enterprise on the international scene and provided the North African nation with vast international experience.

Twice named Tunisian Footballer of the Year, Baya suited up for his country at the 1998 World Cup in France and at the 1996 Atlanta Olympics. He was also a key member of Tunisian sides that competed at the 1998, 2000 and 2002 African Nations Cup finals. He made his international swansong at the 2002 FIFA World Cup, retiring shortly afterwards.

Career
Born in M'saken, Baya began his football career at Étoile du Sahel, helping the Tunisian club win the African Cup Winners' Cup. He made his debut for Tunisia on 4 September 1994 against Guinea-Bissau where he scored his first international goal. Over the past eight years, he has become an integral player for his country, earning 81 caps and scoring 18 goals for his country.

His hard work at Étoile du Sahel did not go unnoticed, as 2. Bundesliga club SC Freiburg signed him to a contract in 1997. In four seasons in Germany, Baya established himself as a star player and a regular starter, scoring 21 goals.

In 2001, Baya was on the move again, this time venturing to Turkey after signing with Beşiktaş. Baya was instrumental in helping Tunisia qualify for its second consecutive World Cup finals. He started in all eight games during the qualification round and scored six goals, finishing as his country's top goal scorer and one of the bright spots on a team wracked by inconsistency in the previous year. After the 2002 FIFA World Cup, he returned to Étoile du Sahel to play out the rest of his playing career.

After completing two seasons with Etoile du Sahel he returned to home club CS M'saken for a season in the Tunisian second division before retiring.

International goals
Scores and results list Tunisia's goal tally first, score column indicates score after each Baya goal.

References

External links
 

1971 births
Living people
People from Sousse Governorate
Tunisian footballers
Association football midfielders
Tunisia international footballers
Olympic footballers of Tunisia
Footballers at the 1996 Summer Olympics
1998 FIFA World Cup players
2002 FIFA World Cup players
1996 African Cup of Nations players
1998 African Cup of Nations players
2000 African Cup of Nations players
2002 African Cup of Nations players
Tunisian Ligue Professionnelle 1 players
Bundesliga players
2. Bundesliga players
Süper Lig players
Étoile Sportive du Sahel players
SC Freiburg players
Beşiktaş J.K. footballers
CS M'saken players
Tunisian expatriate footballers
Tunisian expatriate sportspeople in Germany
Expatriate footballers in Germany
Tunisian expatriate sportspeople in Turkey
Expatriate footballers in Turkey